Marjorie Lajoie (born November 6, 2000) is a Canadian ice dancer. With her partner Zachary Lagha, she is the 2023 Four Continents bronze medalist, a two-time Grand Prix bronze medalist, 2022 CS Nepela Memorial champion, 2022 CS Budapest Trophy champion, and a three-time Canadian national medalist. Lajoie and Lagha represented Canada at the 2022 Winter Olympics.

She is also the 2019 World Junior champion, the 2016 Youth Olympic bronze medalist in the team event, and a three-time Canadian national junior champion.

Personal life 
Lajoie was born on November 6, 2000, in Boucherville, Quebec. Aside from skating, she has worked as an actress, appearing in commercials and on the Canadian TV series Just Kidding. She limits her auditions to small parts so as not to interfere with skating. Her elder brother competes in judo.  Lajoie's younger brother, Charles-Étienne, is autistic, and she organized an "Atypical Skating" charity event to raise money benefiting the Autism Foundation.

Skating career

Early years 
Lajoie began learning to skate in 2004. She teamed up with Zachary Lagha in 2011. They won the novice title at the 2015 Canadian Championships, coached by Julien Lalonde, Mylène Girard, and Valérie Allard in Saint-Hubert, Quebec.

2015–2016 season: Junior debut 
Following their novice title win, the two ended their partnership, later stating that they had different ideas at the time. Lajoie briefly formed a new partnership with Anton Spiridonov, but the two never progressed beyond training. Subsequently, Lagha transferred to train with Marie-France Dubreuil, who encouraged them to reunite in the summer of 2015. They then moved to train with Dubreuil, Patrice Lauzon, Romain Haguenauer, and Pascal Denis in Montreal, Quebec. Making their junior international debut, they placed seventh at a Junior Grand Prix (JGP) event in early October 2015 in Logroño, Spain.

In January 2016, Lajoie/Lagha were awarded the junior silver medal at the Canadian Championships after placing fourth in the short dance and second in the free. The following month, they placed fourth in the main competition at the 2016 Winter Youth Olympics in Hamar, Norway. Competing as members of Team Discovery, they won the bronze medal in the team event. In March, they ranked eleventh in the short dance, thirteenth in the free dance, and thirteenth overall at the 2016 World Junior Championships in Debrecen, Hungary.

2016–2017 season: First junior national title 

Competing in the 2016 JGP series, Lajoie/Lagha placed fourth in Yokohama, Japan, and Dresden, Germany. At Skate Canada Challenge 2017, they broke the Canadian record in Junior ice dance, held since 2005 by Tessa Virtue and Scott Moir. They won the junior national title at the 2017 Canadian Championships. In March, they placed fifth in the short dance, seventh in the free dance, and sixth overall at the 2017 World Junior Championships in Taipei, Taiwan.

2017–2018 season: Second junior national title 
Lajoie/Lagha opened the 2017 JGP series with a silver medal win at the JGP Australia event in Brisbane. They went on to win gold at JGP Croatia in Zagreb, setting new personal bests in the short dance and combined total score. These results qualified them for the Junior Grand Prix Final in Nagoya, Japan. Lajoie sustained a concussion and a hip injury due to a fall in practice. After a month of recuperating, she returned to training two weeks before the Junior Grand Prix Final, where the duo placed sixth.

Lajoie/Lagha defended their junior national title at the 2018 Canadian Championships, breaking their own Canadian record. They closed out the season at the 2018 World Junior Championships in Sofia, Bulgaria. They placed second in the short dance, earning a silver small medal, but placed fifth in the free dance, placing them narrowly off the podium in fourth place. Lajoie commented: "The free dance went super well for us. We were in the moment and managed the stress. We achieved our goal by being in the mix for a spot on the podium."

2018–2019 season: Junior World title 
After some debate over their free program music for the year, Lagha proposed Richard Addinsell's Warsaw Concerto, which was subsequently adopted. Desiring not to do a classical tango for the rhythm dance, Lajoie and Lagha picked a medley of songs by the contemporary Argentinian group Otros Aires.

Lajoie/Lagha began the 2018 JGP series at the JGP Austria event in Linz, winning the silver medal. The team's choreographic character step sequence was ruled invalid, costing them points. Lajoie expressed dissatisfaction with the performance, stating, "the presentation was good, but there’s a lot of work to do at the technical level." They took gold at JGP Canada, scoring personal bests in both segments, breaking again the junior Canadian record, and qualified to their second Junior Grand Prix Final. At the Final the duo placed fourth, 0.03 points behind bronze medallists Elizaveta Khudaiberdieva and Nikita Nazarov, following a 1 point deduction for an extended lift.

At the 2019 Canadian Championships, Lajoie/Lagha won their third consecutive junior title, a national record.  Their margin over silver medallists Alicia Fabbri / Paul Ayer was 21.14 points.  As a "test run" for the World Junior Championships, the two then competed at the 2019 Bavarian Open, an event they had won silver at two seasons prior, this time winning gold, 24.7 points ahead of silver medallists Fabbri/Ayer.

Concluding the season at the 2019 World Junior Championships, Lajoie/Lagha placed first in the rhythm dance, setting a new junior world record of 70.14.  They were awarded a gold small medal for the result.  They then won the free dance as well, setting new world records for that segment and for total score, taking the World Junior title.  Lajoie/Lagha were only the second Canadian team to win World Junior gold in ice dance, the first being Virtue and Moir in 2006.  Lagha said that rewarding after a number of disappointing results in the previous two seasons.

2019–2020 season: Senior debut
Lajoie/Lagha began their senior career with two Challenger events.  They placed seventh at the 2019 CS Lombardia Trophy, which Lajoie described as a disappointment following twizzle errors by her in the free dance.  They next came fourth at the 2019 CS Finlandia Trophy, missing the podium by less than two points due to an invalidated choreographic character step.  Despite that, Lajoie called the result "a big step up for us."  Making their senior Grand Prix debut at the 2019 Skate Canada International, they placed seventh in the rhythm dance and then moved up to sixth following the free dance.  Competing at the 2019 Rostelecom Cup, they placed seventh after struggles in the rhythm dance.

With training mates and presumptive silver medallists Fournier Beaudry/Sørensen sitting out the 2020 Canadian Championships, Lajoie/Lagha competed with Soucisse/Firus for the silver medal.  Both teams made errors in the rhythm dance, with Lagha bobbling on his twizzle sequence, but they nevertheless placed second in the rhythm dance.  Clean in the free dance, but for Lagha stumbling in a choreographic sequence, they were second in that segment as well and won the silver medal, earning assignments to both the Four Continents Championships and the World Championships in their home town of Montreal.

Competing at Four Continents in Seoul, Lajoie/Lagha placed fifth in the rhythm dance with a new personal best score of 76.43, an increase of over five points internationally.  They unexpectedly placed ahead of American national bronze medallists Hawayek/Baker, who fell out of their lift.  They placed behind Hawayek/Baker in the free dance but remained in fifth place overall, again recording significant improvements in their free dance and total scores.  Lagha said afterwards, "there was not one time this season yet when we skated without any major mistakes. Even at nationals, there were some stumbles, but now we finally did two good performances."

Though scheduled to make their World Championship debut, this was prevented by the cancellation of the Montreal World Championships due to the COVID-19 pandemic. Both reported being disappointed, but Lajoie added, "our season before this was very good, so it’s not the end of the world."

2020–2021 season: Worlds debut 
Lajoie/Lagha were assigned to the 2020 Skate Canada International, but this event was also cancelled due to the pandemic.

With the pandemic continuing to make holding in-person competitions difficult domestically, Lajoie/Lagha made their competitive debut at a virtually-held 2021 Skate Canada Challenge, where they placed third in both segments to take the bronze medal.  The 2021 Canadian Championships were subsequently cancelled.

On February 25, Lajoie/Lagha were announced as part of the Canadian team for the 2021 World Championships, their senior World Championship debut following the earlier cancellation of the 2020 World Championships. They placed fourteenth in Stockholm.

2021–2022 season: Beijing Olympics 
Lajoie and Lagha made their season debut at the 2021 CS Autumn Classic International, where they placed fourth. At their second Challenger event, the 2021 CS Finlandia Trophy, they came seventh in a very competitive field. On the result, Lajoie said, "in the end, we were quite happy about it."

On the Grand Prix at the 2021 Skate Canada International, the first Canadian competition with an audience in over a year and a half, Lajoie/Lagha placed sixth. Lagha said afterwards, "we didn't get the score and placement we wanted, but the standing ovation was great!" At their second Grand Prix, the 2021 NHK Trophy in Tokyo, they placed fifth, including a fourth-place finish in the free dance.

Competing at their second senior Canadian championships, held in Ottawa without an audience due to restrictions prompted by the Omicron variant, Lajoie/Lagha placed third in the rhythm dance. They were third in the free dance as well, despite Lajoie flubbing a twizzle set and won the bronze medal. She said afterwards, "every element we did, there was a little something; we were struggling, and we are not used to that." They nevertheless were pleased with the result. The following day they were named to the Canadian Olympic team.

Lajoie/Lagha placed thirteenth in the rhythm dance at the 2022 Winter Olympics dance event. Scott Moir, commentating on the segment, called them "the team that we're all going to be watching in 2026." They remained thirteenth after the free dance, with Lajoie saying, "I think we did a pretty good job, especially because it’s such a stressful environment." They concluded the season at the 2022 World Championships in Montpellier, with the International Skating Union banning all Russian athletes due to their country's invasion of Ukraine. Lajoie/Lagha finished thirteenth in the rhythm dance, a disappointing result, but rose to eleventh overall with a tenth-place free dance.

2022–2023 season: Four Continents bronze, Challenger and Grand Prix success 
For several months beginning in the offseason, Lajoie's family took in Ukrainian refugee skaters Mariia Holubtsova and Kyryl Bielobrov, who had relocated to train at the Ice Academy of Montreal as a result of the Russian invasion of their country. She later said that "they are part of the family now."

In the first of two Challenger assignments, Lajoie/Lagha won gold at the 2022 CS Nepela Memorial, their first international senior medal and title. Lagha considered their effort "O.K. for a first skate despite a little mistake. We don't want to do mistakes anymore." Weeks later at the 2022 CS Budapest Trophy, they set a new set of personal bests, clearing 80 points in the rhythm dance, 120 points in the free dance, and 200 points in total score, all for the first time. Lagha said he remained unsatisfied with the free dance performance, which he considered "a bit too safe."

On the Grand Prix at the 2022 Skate Canada International, Lajoie/Lagha were fourth in the rhythm dance after errors put them narrowly behind Americans Green/Parsons. In the free dance, they overtook Green/Parsons for the bronze medal, their first on the senior Grand Prix. Two weeks later, they won a second bronze medal at the 2022 MK John Wilson Trophy in Sheffield. They had spent the intervening time working on their twizzle element, which had given the issues at their first Grand Prix event, and said they were pleased with the resulting performance.

With defending national champions Gilles/Poirier absent from the 2023 Canadian Championships due to Gilles requiring an appendectomy, the national ice dance title was considered more open than previously, to which Lagha remarked "we try not to focus on that, but we can always dream right?" They finished second in the rhythm dance, narrowly behind training partners Fournier Beaudry/Sørensen. They won the free dance after Fournier Beaudry/Sørensen botched their closing element, but remained narrowly second overall by 0.60 points and won their second national silver. Lajoie said afterward that it had been a "mental fight" for both of them that day, "but, we did it." As Canada had only two berths at the 2023 World Championships due to Gilles/Poirier and Fournier Beaudry/Sørensen's ordinals the prior year, Lajoie/Lagha were assigned only to compete at the 2023 Four Continents Championships.

With Gilles/Poirier absent as well from the Four Continents Championships, Lajoie/Lagha were considered challengers for the podium. Despite low step sequence levels, they placed third in the rhythm dance, 2.07 points clear of fourth-place Carreira/Ponomarenko, while expected rivals Green/Parsons were a distant fifth after Parsons fell. They were third in the free dance as well with a new personal best score of 120.96, for a total score of an even 200.00 points. They won the bronze medal, their first ISU championship medal at the senior level. Lagha called the result "the cherry on top of a perfect season," with Lajoie noting "we have a podium finish in every competition" that they had entered.

Programs 
(with Lagha)

Records and achievements 
(with Lagha)

 They became the first junior team to score above 70 at 2019 Junior World Championships.

Junior world record scores 
Lajoie/Lagha set four junior world record scores under the new +5 / -5 GOE (Grade of Execution) system and currently hold one.

Competitive highlights 
GP: Grand Prix; CS: Challenger Series; JGP: Junior Grand Prix

 With Lagha

Detailed results
(with Lagha)

ISU personal bests highlighted in bold.  Small medals for rhythm and free dances awarded at ISU Championships only.

References

External links 
 

! colspan="3" style="border-top: 5px solid #78FF78;" |World Junior Record Holders

2000 births
Canadian female ice dancers
Living people
People from Boucherville
Figure skaters at the 2016 Winter Youth Olympics
World Junior Figure Skating Championships medalists
Figure skaters at the 2022 Winter Olympics
Olympic figure skaters of Canada
Youth Olympic bronze medalists for Canada
Four Continents Figure Skating Championships medalists